Stigmella tiliella is a moth of the family Nepticulidae. It is found in Ohio and Kentucky in the United States.

The wingspan is 3.4–4 mm. There are two generations per year. Adults are on wing in mid-June and early August or late July. Late instar larvae have been found in late August and in early July.

The larvae feed on Tilia americana. They mine the leaves of their host plant. The mine is located on the upper-surface of the leaf and is long and linear with a tendency toward a spiral form. There are frequent angular turns. The frass is deposited irregularly across the entire width of the mine in the first four-fifths but as a dense, central line in terminal portion.

External links
Nepticulidae of North America
A taxonomic revision of the North American species of Stigmella (Lepidoptera: Nepticulidae)

Nepticulidae
Moths of North America
Moths described in 1912